Michael Saul Dell (born February 23, 1965) is an American billionaire businessman and philanthropist. He is the founder, chairman, and CEO of Dell Technologies, one of the world's largest technology infrastructure companies. He is ranked the 24th richest person in the world by Bloomberg Billionaires Index, with a net worth of $45 billion as of October 2022.

In 2011, his 243.35 million shares of Dell stock were worth $3.5 billion, giving him 12% ownership of the company. His remaining wealth of roughly $10 billion is invested in other companies and is managed by MSD Capital, which incorporates his initials. In January 2013 it was announced that he had bid to take Dell Inc. private for $24.4 billion in the biggest management buyout since the Great Recession. Dell Inc. officially went private in October 2013. The company once again went public in December 2018.

Early life and education
Dell was born in 1965 in Houston, to a Jewish family. His parents were Lorraine Charlotte (née Langfan), a stockbroker, and Alexander Dell, an orthodontist. Michael Dell attended Herod Elementary School in Houston. He would go on to attend Memorial High School. In a bid to enter business early, he applied to take a high school equivalency exam at age eight. In his early teens, he invested his earnings from part-time jobs in stocks and precious metals.

Dell purchased his first calculator at age seven and encountered an early teletype terminal in junior high. At age 15, after playing with computers at Radio Shack, he got his first computer, an Apple II, which he promptly disassembled to see how it worked. Dell attended Memorial High School in Houston, selling subscriptions to the Houston Post in the summer. Dell's parents wanted him to be a doctor and in order to please them, he took up pre-med at the University of Texas in 1983. Dell continued learning to target specific populations for newspaper subscriptions rather than just making cold calls, and earned $18,000 that summer. He hired several employees, and after earning a gross profit of nearly $200,000 in his first year of business, Dell dropped out of the University of Texas at age 19.

Business career

While a freshman pre-med student at the University of Texas, Dell started an informal business putting together and selling upgrade kits for personal computers in Room 2713 of the Dobie Center residential building. He then applied for a vendor license to bid on contracts for the State of Texas, winning bids by not having the overhead of a computer store.

In January 1984, Dell banked on his conviction that the potential cost savings of a manufacturer selling PCs directly had enormous advantages over the conventional indirect retail channel. In January 1984, Dell registered his company as "PC's Limited". Operating out of a condominium, the business sold between $50,000 and $80,000 worth of PC upgrades, kits, and add-on components. In May, Dell incorporated the company as "Dell Computer Corporation" and relocated to a business center in North Austin. The company employed a few people as order takers, a few more to fill the orders, and, as Dell recalled, a manufacturing staff consisting of "three guys with screwdrivers sitting at six-foot tables". The venture's capitalization cost was $1,000.

In 1992, aged 27, he became the youngest CEO of a company ranked in Fortune magazine's list of the top 500 corporations. In 1996, Dell started selling computers over the Web, the same year his company launched its first servers. Dell Inc. soon reported about $1 million in sales per day from dell.com. In the first quarter of 2001, Dell Inc. reached a world market share of 12.8 percent, surpassing Compaq to become the world's largest PC maker. The metric marked the first time the rankings had shifted over the previous seven years. The company's combined shipments of desktops, notebooks and servers grew 34.3 percent worldwide and 30.7 percent in the United States at a time when competitors' sales were shrinking.

In 1998, Dell founded MSD Capital L.P. to manage his family's investments. Investment activities include publicly traded securities, private equity activities, and real estate. The firm employs 80 people and has offices in New York, Santa Monica and London. Dell himself is not involved in day-to-day operations. On March 4, 2004, Dell stepped down as CEO, but stayed as chairman of Dell Inc.'s board, while Kevin Rollins, then president and COO, became president and CEO. On January 31, 2007, Dell returned as CEO at the request of the board, succeeding Rollins.

In 2013, Michael Dell with the help of Silver Lake Partners, Microsoft, and a consortium of lenders took Dell, Inc. private. The deal was reportedly worth $25 billion and faced difficulties during its execution. Notable resistance came from Carl Icahn, but after several months he stepped aside. Michael Dell received a 75% stake in the private company.

On October 12, 2015, Dell Inc. announced its intent to acquire the enterprise software and storage company EMC Corporation. At $67 billion, it has been labeled the "highest-valued tech acquisition in history". The acquisition was finalized September 7, 2016.

Penalty
In July 2010 Dell Inc. agreed to pay a $100 million penalty to settle SEC charges of disclosure and accounting fraud in relation to undisclosed payments from Intel Corporation. Michael Dell and former CEO Kevin Rollins agreed to pay $4 million each and former CFO James Schneider agreed to pay $3 million to settle the charges.

Accolades
Accolades for Dell include "Entrepreneur of the Year" (at age 24) from Inc. magazine; "Top CEO in American Business" from Worth magazine; "CEO of the Year" from Financial World, Industry Week and Chief Executive magazines. Dell also received the 1998 Golden Plate Award of the American Academy of Achievement and the 2013 Franklin Institute's Bower Award for Business Leadership.

Affiliations
Dell serves on the Foundation Board of the World Economic Forum, the executive committee of the International Business Council, the U.S. Business Council. He previously served as a member of the U.S. President's Council of Advisors on Science and Technology.

In April 2020, Governor Greg Abbott named Dell to the Strike Force to Open Texas – a group "tasked with finding safe and effective ways to slowly reopen the state" during the COVID-19 pandemic. He also serves as an advisor on the COVID-19 Technology Task Force, a technology industry coalition founded in March 2020 collaborating on solutions to respond to and recover from the COVID-19 pandemic.

Writings
Dell's 1999 book, Direct from Dell: Strategies That Revolutionized an Industry (by HarperBusiness), is an account of his early life, his company's founding, growth and missteps, as well as lessons learned. The book was written in collaboration with Catherine Fredman.

Dell's second book, Play Nice But Win: A CEO's Journey from Founder to Leader (by Portfolio), is a story of inside battles that defined him as a leader. The book was written in collaboration with James Kaplan.

Wealth
Forbes estimated Dell's net worth at $50.4 billion .

In February 2018, it was reported that in 2014, Dell had paid $100.5 million for Manhattan's One57 penthouse, which was then a record for the most expensive home ever sold in the city.

Personal life
Dell married Susan Lieberman on October 28, 1989, in Austin, Texas; the couple reside there with their four children.

Philanthropy
In 1999, Michael and Susan Dell established the Michael and Susan Dell Foundation, which focuses on, among other causes, grants, urban education, childhood health and family economic stability. In 2006, the foundation provided $50 million in grants to three health-related organizations associated with the University of Texas: the Michael & Susan Dell Center for Advancement of Healthy Living, the Dell Pediatric Research Institute to complement the Dell Children's Medical Center, as well as funding for a new computer science building at the University of Texas at Austin campus. In 2013, the foundation provided an additional $50 million commitment to establish the Dell Medical School at the University of Texas at Austin. Since 1999, the MSDF has committed $1.23 billion to non-profits and social enterprises in the United States, India and South Africa. Dell is also behind the founding of the Dell Jewish Community Campus in the Northwest Hills neighborhood of Austin.

By 2011, the foundation had committed more than $650 million to children's issues and community initiatives in the United States, India and South Africa. Today the foundation has over $466 million assets under management.

In 2002, Dell received an honorary doctorate in Economic Science from the University of Limerick in honor of his investment in Ireland and the local community and for his support for educational initiatives.

In 2012, the Michael and Susan Dell Foundation committed $50 million for medical education. The Dell Medical School began enrolling students in 2016.

In 2014, he donated $1.8 million to the Friends of the Israel Defense Forces.

In 2017, in the wake of Hurricane Harvey, Dell, a Houston native, pledged $36 million to relief efforts.

In May 2017, Dell donated $1 billion to his foundation, which focuses on child poverty; it makes both impact investments and charitable donations.

In 2018, Dell Technologies returned to public markets through a complicated financial restructuring.

References

Further reading
 
 Koehn, Nancy F. Brand New: How Entrepreneurs Earned Consumers' Trust from Wedgwood to Dell (2001) pp 257–306.
 Magretta, Joan. "The power of virtual integration: An interview with Dell Computer's Michael Dell." Harvard Business Review (1998): pp-73+. online

External links

 

American chief executives of manufacturing companies
American computer businesspeople
Dell people
1965 births
Living people
20th-century American businesspeople
21st-century American businesspeople
American billionaires
American business writers
American commodities traders
American financiers
American investors
American nonprofit businesspeople
American political fundraisers
American real estate businesspeople
American stock traders
American technology chief executives
American technology company founders
American technology writers
Businesspeople from Texas
Jewish American philanthropists
Jewish American writers
Private equity and venture capital investors
Texas Republicans
University of Texas at Austin alumni
Writers from Texas
American people of German-Jewish descent
Memorial High School (Hedwig Village, Texas) alumni
21st-century American Jews